Stas is a reduced form, among many, of the Slavic language given name Stanislav known under several spellings (etc.). It may also serve as a given name of its own.  Notable people commonly referred to with the name Stas or variants include:

Stas Pokatilov,  Kazakh footballer
 Tryzuby Stas, "Tridental Stas", stage name of a Ukrainian singer-songwriter Stanislav Ivanovych Shcherbatykh
Stas Namin, Soviet and Russian-Armenian musician
Stas Maliszewski,  Polish American former football linebacker
Stas Misezhnikov, Israeli politician
Stas Piekha, Russian pop singer and actor
Stas Mikhaylov, Russian pop singer and songwriter

Staś Kmieć, Polish theatre and dance choreographer
Staš Skube, Slovenian handball player

See also

Stasia "Stas" Irons